For the Roses is the fifth studio album by Canadian singer-songwriter Joni Mitchell. It was released in November 1972, between her two biggest commercial and critical successes—Blue and Court and Spark. In 2007 it was one of 25 recordings chosen that year by the Library of Congress to be added to the National Recording Registry.

For the Roses is perhaps best known for the hit single "You Turn Me On, I'm a Radio", which Mitchell wrote sarcastically out of a record company request for a radio-friendly song. The single was a success, peaking at number 25 on the Billboard Hot 100 chart, becoming Mitchell's first top 40 hit released under her own name (as a songwriter, several other performers had had hits with songs that she had written). "Cold Blue Steel and Sweet Fire", a menacing and jazzy portrait of her then lover James Taylor's heroin addiction, which was also released as a single, backed with "Blonde in the Bleachers" and the Beethoven-inspired "Judgment of the Moon and Stars" were also popular.

Background
Some of the songs were inspired by Mitchell's 1970–1971 relationship with James Taylor. By March 1971, his fame exploded, causing friction. She was reportedly devastated when he broke off the relationship. By November 1971, he had taken up with Carly Simon, whom he married a year later.

Songs
 "Banquet" describes a metaphorical table from which "some get the gravy / Some get the gristle... and some get nothing / Though there's plenty to spare". 
 "Cold Blue Steel and Sweet Fire" is a menacing and jazzy portrait of a lover's heroin addiction – and his need to find the sweet release of the drug through the cold blue steel of the needle.
 In  "Barangrill", Mitchell uses the hunt for an elusive roadside eatery as a metaphor for the quest to "find herself", enjoying the journey, but with increasing impatience about reaching her destination. 
 "Lesson in Survival" is about the longing for greater privacy, a sense of isolation, the frustration of incompatibility, and a love for nature. 
 "Let the Wind Carry Me" contrasts thoughts of a more stable, conventional life, based partly on Mitchell's own adolescence, with the need to live with minimal constraints upon one's freedom. 
 The title song is both a self-portrait and a cool assessment of the frustration and sadness of a lover being a celebrity, dealing with the challenges of fame and fortune.
 The second side opens with "See You Sometime", which deals with fleeting feelings, including jealousy and romantic competition. 
 "Electricity" extols the simplicity and serenity of the quiet country life against the way in which people in modern society think of themselves unconsciously as machines, and is thought to be motivated by a particular relationship triangle she was experiencing at the time. 
 "Woman of Heart and Mind" is a portrait of a flawed lover and the complexities of being emotionally involved.
 The album closes with the Beethoven-inspired "Judgment of the Moon and Stars", subtitled Ludwig's Tune.

Cover art
While the final cover depicts a conventional picture of Mitchell in a forest setting, she originally intended for the cover to be one of her own ink-and-felt-pen drawings, titled For the Roses and featuring "a bunch of roses sticking out of a horse's ass" (the imagery of which related to her feelings on the music industry). When this was rejected by Asylum Records on the grounds that they wanted her face on the cover, Mitchell presented them with a full-rear nude photograph of herself standing on ocean rocks, and was only dissuaded after David Geffen pointed out that "she wouldn't like (an) 'Only $4.99' (sticker) slapped across her ass." The nude photograph was used for the inner gatefold of the album instead.

Critical reception

For the Roses was met with critical acclaim. The New York Times said in 1973, "Each of Mitchell's songs on For the Roses is a gem glistening with her elegant way with language, her pointed splashes of irony and her perfect shaping of images. Never does Mitchell voice a thought or feeling commonly. She's a songwriter and singer of genius who can't help but make us feel we are not alone." Writing for Rolling Stone, Stephen Davis applauded the singer's ability to explore a variety of emotional perspectives, sometimes in the course of one song: "Her great charm and wit, her intense vocal acting and phrasing abilities (the way she chooses to deal with a single word can change the feeling of an entire song) and the sheer power and gumption of her presence combine to bring it all off and make it shine." Randall Davis from the Arcadia Tribune found it difficult to analyze but ultimately "a very nice album, pleasant to listen to and, as always with Joni, it is full of sensitive, meaningful lyrics placed against a background of light rock with folky rhythms." In The Michigan Daily, Mike Harper called it the folk rock album of the year, "deeply personal and at times self-denyingly severe", saying "this album lacks the innocence of, say, Ladies of the Canyon but what it gains in womanly heart and wisdom is unmistakably greater: sincere but moreover real, For the Roses is emotionally fulfilling in the best sense of the word."

For the Roses was named the seventh best album of 1972 in Robert Christgau's year-end list for Newsday. In his review for Creem, he said the music lacked the liveliness of Blues "All I Want" and the lyrics' insularity diminished her voice, but he ultimately regarded the album as a "remarkable work" and the year's aesthetically boldest record. "Mitchell has integrated the strange shifts of her voice into an almost 'classical' sounding music", Christgau wrote, calling it "hypnotic when you give it a chance to work".
It was voted number 148 in Colin Larkin's All Time Top 1000 Albums 3rd Edition (2000).

In 2007, the Library of Congress added the album to its National Recording Registry. In an essay accompanying the selection, Cary O'Dell wrote that the record was "Mitchell's first overt foray into jazz, a genre that, for the next several years, would come to dominate her art."

Track listing
All tracks are written by Joni Mitchell.

Personnel
 Joni Mitchell – vocals, guitar, piano
 Tom Scott – woodwinds, reeds
 Wilton Felder – bass
 Russ Kunkel – drums
 Bobbye Hall – percussion
 Bobby Notkoff – strings
 James Burton – electric guitar on "Cold Blue Steel and Sweet Fire"
 Graham Nash – harmonica on "You Turn Me On I'm a Radio"
 Stephen Stills – rock and roll band on "Blonde in the Bleachers"

Technical
 Henry Lewy – sound engineer, production guidance
 Anthony Hudson – art direction, design 
 Joel Bernstein – photography

Charts

References

External links
 Joni Mitchell's New For The Roses, Robert Hilburn, Los Angeles Times, 21 November 1972; appears at the unofficial site JoniMitchell.com

1972 albums
Joni Mitchell albums
Asylum Records albums
Albums recorded at A&M Studios
United States National Recording Registry recordings
Albums produced by Joni Mitchell
United States National Recording Registry albums